The Pohorje Transmitter (also known as Maribor 1) is a facility for radio and TV-broadcasting in the Pohorje Mountains west of Maribor, northeastern Slovenia,  above sea level. Although this tower is designed as free-standing, it is guyed at two levels in six directions. This extensive additional guying is unusual, especially considering that the tower is not very tall and that it is situated in a forest area.

Radiated programmes

Analogue radio (FM)

Digital radio (DAB+) 
Pohorje makes up a single-frequency network (SFN) with 6 other transmitters (Krim, Krvavec, Nanos, Plešivec, Tinjan and Trdinov vrh). In summer 2016 the SFN covered 89% of highways and 67% of households for indoor reception with a portable receiver. Programs use HE-AAC v2 audiocodec.

There are 2 reports of a successful long-distance reception of the multiplex from this transmitter in Slovakia in Skalica and near Topoľčany, 290 km away.

Digital television (DVB-T) 

Until the middle of 2012 Mux B from Norkring was broadcasting on channel 67. The operator left the Slovenian market.

Analogue television (PAL) 
Analogue channels were broadcast until 1 December 2010.

See also
 Additionally guyed tower
 List of towers

Notes

References

External links
 Pictures of the Pohorje transmitting site
 http://www.dxpg.at/senderfotos/slowenien/pohorje.htm
 RTV Slovenija Transmission towers (in Slovenian)

Towers in Slovenia
Radio masts and towers in Europe
Transmitter sites in Slovenia
transmitter